Daulat is a 2020 Malaysian Malay-language political thriller film directed and written by Imran Sheik. It tells the story of a politician and her party plotting a feisty political comeback after having just lost the last election, ready to do whatever it takes to win.

It was released on 6 April 2020 online on Iflix.

Synopsis
The ruling political party MUNA has lost in the recent general election. Hassan, the party's president employs Suri, a rising female politician as the party's new deputy president. Suri decides to go all out to make sure that the party wins in the next general election, at all costs. Willing to pay any price, she and the team initiates an elaborate plan to attain power. 

As part of her cunning strategy, Suri plots with her husband, Idrus and takes advantage of his position and power as the CEO of a national news company to create slander and propaganda against the rival party. A young journalist, Jasmin is involved as she becomes responsible for spreading this news. Jasmin feels obligated to play her part as she owes Idrus for her father’s life which later turns into a love affair. What happens next?

Cast
 Vanida Imran, as SuriDeputy president of opposition party MUNA; wife of Idrus.
 Rashidi Ishak, as IdrusCEO of media company Media Raya; husband of Suri. 
 Tony Eusoff, as HassanPresident of opposition party MUNA
 Cristina Suzanne Stockstill, as Nadiya HassanCOO of Media Raya; daughter of Hassan.
Jasmine Suraya Chin, as Jasmin ChoA journalist at Media Raya
 Zul Zamir, as Ali FahimDeputy prime minister from ruling party WAWASAN
Jalaluddin Hassan, as MalikPrime minister from WAWASAN
 Sangeeta Krishnasamy, as MelissaA liberal politician
 Amar Asyraf, as SaifulPresident of party Hizbul Muslimin
 Dain Iskandar Said, as Political analysts

Release
The film is fictional and was made in 2019 before the event of 2020 Malaysian political crisis. It is filmed in 14 days with a budget of RM500,000. 

The film is released online for free and uncensored, on 6 April 2020 exclusively for Iflix after a series of private screenings with industry experts and close enthusiastic cineastes. The production team originally opted for a theatrical release, but decided to distribute in streaming service to avoid cuts by the Film Censorship Board of Malaysia.

References

External links

Daulat on Iflix

2020 films
2020s political thriller films
Malay-language films
Malaysian thriller films
2020 thriller films